Jung Ye-rin (born August 19, 1996), known mononymously as Yerin, is a South Korean singer and actress. She is a former member of the South Korean girl group GFriend and is currently active as a soloist.

Early life 
Yerin was born on August 19, 1996, in Incheon. She attended the School of Performing Arts Seoul and graduated in 2015.

Career

2015–2021: Activities with GFriend 
In January 2015, Yerin officially debuted as a member of GFriend with their first extended play, Season of Glass. She made her acting debut two months later playing a supporting role in the web drama Midnight's Girl. On April 13, 2015, she appeared in Super Junior Heechul and TRAX Jungmo unit M&D's music video "I Wish".

In January 2016, Yerin was chosen as a new MC for SBS MTV's music program The Show, alongside Zhou Mi. On October 17, 2016, she featured the song "Future Boyfriend" with El Camino.

In 2017, Yerin collaborated with Cao Lu and Kisum on the single "Spring Again". Later that year, she participated in SBS's reality-documentary show Law of the Jungle, featuring in the episodes in Komodo.

2021–present: Solo activities 
In June 2021, Yerin signed with Sublime Artist Agency as a solo artist and actress.

In February 2022, Yerin hosted an entertainment show of MBN "Catch Job" with broadcaster Cho Woo-Jong. In May 2022, Yerin made her solo debut with the extended play Aria. She is set to be an MC in MBC's Crazy Encounter Season 4.

Discography

Extended plays

Singles

Soundtrack appearances

Other charted songs

Composition credits 
All song credits are adapted from the Korea Music Copyright Association's database unless stated otherwise.

Filmography

Web series

Television show

Web shows

Radio show

Music videos

Notes

References

External links 

 Official website 

Living people
1996 births
People from Incheon
K-pop singers
GFriend members
School of Performing Arts Seoul alumni
South Korean women pop singers
South Korean female idols
South Korean web series actresses
21st-century South Korean singers
21st-century South Korean women singers
South Korean television personalities
21st-century South Korean actresses
Hybe Corporation artists